This is a list of Windmill sailboat championships.

*Note: In 2002, there was an incorrect initial scoring by the race committee, leading them to declare co-champions

References

Windmill (sailing dinghy)